Touroulia is a genus of flowering plants belonging to the family Ochnaceae.

Its native range is Southern America.

Species:
 Touroulia amazonica Pires & A.S.Foster 
 Touroulia guianensis Aubl.

References

Ochnaceae
Malpighiales genera